Laura Hope Crews (December 12, 1879 – November 12, 1942) was an American actress who is best remembered today for her later work as a character actress in motion pictures of the 1930s. Her best-known film role was Aunt Pittypat in Gone with the Wind.

Early life
Crews was the daughter of stage actress Angelena Lockwood and backstage carpenter John Thomas Crews. She had three older siblings. Crews started acting at age four. Her first stage appearance was at Woodward's Gardens. She stopped acting to finish school and then returned to acting in 1898. As she was a native San Franciscan, the records pertaining to her early life were destroyed in the earthquake and fire of 1906.

Most of Crews' formal education came in San Jose, as the family had moved there following the remarriage of Crews' mother.

Career
In 1898, Crews performed in San Francisco as an ingenue with the Alcazar Stock Company. Two years later, she and her mother moved to New York City, where Crews began to act with the Henry V. Donnelly Stock Company.

Crews appeared in plays written by A.A. Milne, who was particularly impressed by her work in his Mr. Pim Passes By (1921). The play was a big success and ran for 232 performances on Broadway. In 1924 she starred in The Werewolf for a run of 112 Broadway performances.

Crews also starred as Judith Bliss in the original Broadway production of Noël Coward's Hay Fever (1925), which she co-directed with Coward. She also appeared in The Silver Cord, written by Sidney Howard, which was produced by the New York Theater Guild in 1926 and ran for 212 performances. When The Silver Cord was not being presented, there were matinee performances of Right You Are If You Think You Are by Luigi Pirandello.

The Silver Cord was later made into a 1933 RKO movie with Crews reprising her onstage role of the mother. The film co-starred Joel McCrea, Frances Dee, and Irene Dunne. In the late 1920s, and because of her years as a stage actress, Crews had been hired as a voice coach by Gloria Swanson to help with her transition to talking pictures.

George Cukor, who had directed her in Camille (1936), recommended her for the role of Aunt Pittypat in Gone With the Wind (1939) after Billie Burke declined it. Cukor wanted Crews to play the role "in a Billie Burke-ish manner" with "the same zany feeling".

Her final stage appearance came in 1942, in the original Broadway run of Arsenic and Old Lace in which she replaced one of the original cast members. She stayed with the production for more than a year and a half on Broadway and in a touring company before she was forced to leave because of illness.

Death
Crews died in the LeRoy Sanitarium in New York City in 1942, following an illness of four months. Some sources say that the illness in which she suffered from was kidney failure. She was laid to rest at Cypress Lawn Memorial Park in Colma, California. 

Crews has a star at 6251 Hollywood Boulevard on the Hollywood Walk of Fame.  

Crews was also the first credited cast member of Gone With The Wind to die.

Filmography

References

External links

 Laura Hope Crews photo gallery at NYP Library

Laura Hope Crews as a young stage actress
Laura Hope Crews page with rare stage photographs

Laura Hope Crews stills Univ. of Washington Sayre Collection
Laura Hope Crews and Leo Ditrichstein in "The Phantom Rival" (1915)
Laura Hope Crews in The Havoc (1911) (Univ. of Washington Sayre Collection)
Crews on the cover of The Theatre magazine, August 1913
 Tears: In Which Silent Pictures Actresses Tell Us How They Weep, article on crying in silent movies

1879 births
1942 deaths
American film actresses
American stage actresses
Deaths from kidney failure
Actresses from San Francisco
20th-century American actresses
American child actresses
19th-century American actresses
Burials at Cypress Lawn Memorial Park